Accelerated Christian Education is an American company which produces the Accelerated Christian Education (ACE, styled by the company as A.C.E.) school curriculum structured around a literal interpretation of the Bible and which teaches other academic subjects from a Protestant fundamentalist or conservative evangelical standpoint. Founded in 1970 by Donald and Esther Howard, ACE's website states it is used in over 6,000 schools in 145 countries. ACE has been criticized for its content, heavy reliance on the use of rote recall as a learning tool and for the educational outcomes of pupils on leaving the Accelerated Christian Education system both in the US and the United Kingdom.

History
Accelerated Christian Education was founded in 1970 by Drs. Donald and Esther Howard. They set about developing a biblically literalist educational curriculum with Donald Howard traveling to promote ACE schools around the world as a new form of "educational mission".

The first school which used the ACE program opened in Garland, Texas, and started with 45 students. By 1980 there were over 3,000 Christian schools in the United States associated with ACE, reaching 8,000 during the 1980s.

In 1992 ACE opened a three-story facility in Lewisville, Texas, to handle its growing operations. Esther Howard took over control of ACE the following year. J. Duane Howard, one of the couple's sons, currently serves as CEO. In 2007, ACE moved its corporate offices to Madison, Tennessee, eventually moving to Hendersonville, Tennessee in 2014. The Lewisville facility remains as ACE's distribution center.

Curriculum approach

According to the curriculum section on its website, ACE's "core curriculum is an individualized, Biblically-based, character-building curriculum package" and is based on a series of workbooks called PACEs (Packets of Accelerated Christian Education). ACE's educational approach uses phonics to teach reading. Children learn using materials based on their level of understanding, not based on their age or chronological grade level and do not progress until they learn the content. At the beginning of each PACE is an overview, a scripture to memorize, a character trait to strive toward, and information on what, if any, supplies the student will need.  Each subject has twelve PACEs per grade level. The basic subjects of ACE are mathematics  (yellow), English (red), Literature (and Creative Writing) (burgundy), Word Building/Etymology (purple), science (blue), social studies (green), and Old and New Testament (light yellow). Students in the Philippines (under School of Tomorrow Philippines) also study Araling Panlipunan (brown) and Filipino (pink).
A new student is given a diagnostic test, and the test results place the student at appropriate levels by subject. Students are required to set daily goals for work completion, score PACE goals correctly and completely, and are generally expected to complete a PACE within two to three weeks (depending on the school). Students are given review activities at certain points in a PACE (called "Checkups") and a test at its culmination (Self Test). Supervisors do not answer PACE questions nor do they give the answer, but guide students and encourage them to find the answer on their own. Should material in some PACE subjects be challenging, supervisors may need to adjust the students' goals accordingly. The passing score for the PACE Test can be from 80% to 90%, also depending on the corresponding school. Students who fail (including those who have committed minor or major scoring violations) (for example, a 100% on all three Checkups and the Self Test, and a 42% on the PACE Test) are mandated to take what measures the school provides to pass the failed PACE subject (such as repeating both the Self Test and PACE Test, just the PACE Test, or the entire PACE).

Distribution and promotion

Schools using the curriculum are not allowed to describe themselves as "ACE schools" or use the ACE logo although schools are expected to sign an agreement and follow the ACE Procedures Manual and Administration Manual.

The program is intended for homeschooling and private establishments; ACE provides instruction and structure for operating a "Christian school". ACE's website advises that schools are not required to use the entire curriculum and may augment it with other resources although this incurs a financial penalty as the school loses its discount.

The company also sells home schooling and distance learning curriculum materials through its Lighthouse Christian Academy (LCA).

ACE provides annual one-day training sessions called Christian Educators' Conventions (CEC) for administrators, supervisors, and monitors. These are provided in locations around the United States. There are also week-long sessions provided for additional training for monitors, supervisors, and other administrative positions.  The sessions focus on understanding and properly implementing the ACE program. For Learning Center Supervisors a four-day workshop is provided annually. The workshop is organized like an ACE classroom, allowing the supervisor to experience the ACE system as a student and learn how to implement the system.

ACE student conventions

Schools that use the ACE curriculum may participate in the Regional Student Conventions  and the top-placed participants are able to proceed to the International Student Convention. This convention is usually held at a university campus, such as Rutgers University (1988), the University of North Texas in Denton (1989 and 1992), Northern Arizona University (1990), Indiana University (1991), and Purdue University (1994). International Student Conventions have also been held at Western Kentucky University (2010) with about 2,500 students, James Madison University (2011) 3,000 attending, New Mexico State University (2015) 2,500 participants, and Indiana University of Pennsylvania (2017) 2,200 students. They have since returned to IUP for a convention in 2022, which held upwards of 1,000 students. The All Africa Student Convention takes place in South Africa once a year at the University of the Free State in Bloemfontein, South Africa.  The All Africa Student Convention is not organized or hosted by ACE United States but by Accelerated Christian Education South Africa, which is a separate organization providing the ACE curriculum to African schools.

The conventions also offer "Events of the Heart", which allow students with mental and physical disabilities to participate. When the conventions first started, a parade in the hosting city would accompany a convention. In 1981, over 3,000 students and sponsors marched in New York City to celebrate the opening of the convention at Rutgers University. Student conventions offer speakers; past speakers have included David Gibbs from the Christian Law Association, Ben Jordan, and William Murray.

Criticism

Use of rote recall
The curriculum's emphasis on rote recall has been criticized by educational researchers. David Berliner described the teaching methods as "low-level cognitive tasks that emphasize simple association and recall activities, as is typical of instruction from workbooks... the materials make heavy use of behavioral objectives, programmed learning, and rewards." D. Flemming and T Hunt in a 1987 article in the education journal Phi Delta Kappa analyzed the ACE curriculum, concluding that "If parents want their children to obtain a very limited and sometimes inaccurate view of the world — one that ignores thinking above the level of rote recall — then the ACE materials do the job very well. The world of the ACE materials is quite a different one from that of scholarship and critical thinking."

Race and apartheid
The ACE curriculum promoted racist stereotypes. One workbook included the following passage:

Although apartheid appears to allow the unfair treatment of blacks, the system has worked well in South Africa .... Although white businessmen and developers are guilty of some unfair treatment of blacks, they turned South Africa into a modern industrialized nation, which the poor, uneducated blacks couldn't have accomplished in several more decades. If more blacks were suddenly given control of the nation, its economy and business, as Mandela wished, they could have destroyed what they have waited and worked so hard for.

In addition, the curriculum has been criticized for its depiction of racially segregated churches and schools.

Content
Science is presented in the ACE curriculum through the framework of Young Earth Creationism (YEC). For example, in Biology 1099, the existence of the Loch Ness monster is presented as a fact (as a plesiosaur), and used as a so-called proof against the scientific theory of evolution. Textbooks published in Europe removed the Loch Ness monster reference in July 2013, but children are still only taught creationism as an explanation for the origin of life on earth.

Textbooks used in the curriculum assert that abortion is wrong, evolution is false, and homosexuality is a choice. They teach that wives must be subservient to their husbands, women's liberation leads to child neglect and that one can avoid AIDS by being abstinent until marriage.

The ACE curriculum in "Science 1096" asserts that solar fusion is a myth, describing it as "an invention of evolution scientists."

As of January 2017, there are 26 schools using the ACE curriculum registered in the United Kingdom. In October 2016, ten schools graded by British parliamentary education inspectors OFSTED were revisited following concerns of mistreatment raised in British press, nine of which were subsequently re-graded as 'inadequate' or 'requires improvement' by the watchdog. In 2018, a further ACE school in London was rated 'inadequate' for failing to teach adequate science and for not teaching children to ″develop the skills to collect and evaluate scientific evidence."

Educational outcomes 

In 2017, research into the International Certificate of Christian Education, the school-leaving qualification provided by ACE in the UK, claimed that it failed to prepare students for university level education. Professor Michael Reiss of University of London stated "My particular problem with ACE is the awful nature of the curriculum they provide to their students." The study by Scaramanga and Reiss states that the curriculum fails students as it is heavily based around memorizing information rather than analyzing and understanding it.

Having researched comparative performance on the American College Test between public school students from one school and ACE students from another private school in the same geographic area, one college student wrote in her thesis in 2005 that "a significant difference was found between the public school graduates' scores and the ACE graduates' scores in all areas of the ACT (English, Math, Reading, and Composite Score), except the area of Science Reasoning. Overall, the ACT scores of the ACE graduates were consistently lower than those of the public school students." The author also noted that "the current study did not account for variables such as socioeconomic status, ethnicity, gender, or parent's level of education. These variables may impact ACT scores and therefore need to be considered in future research," nor was demographic information of the public school used for comparison. Furthermore, the sample size of graduates from ACE was disproportionately small in this analysis.

In April 2019, the University of South Africa warned that applicants who completed their Grade 12 or equivalent using the ACE (Accelerated Christian Education) School of Tomorrow curriculum may not meet the admission criteria.

See also
Responsive Education Solutions

References

Education companies of the United States
Publishing companies established in 1970
Companies based in Tennessee